Robert Hue Wallace (born September 17, 1954) is an American former college football coach and athletics administrator. He served as head football coach at the University of North Alabama at 1988 to 1997 and again from 2012 to 2016, at Temple University from 1998 to 2005, and at the University of West Alabama from 2006 to 2010. Wallace led the North Alabama Lions to three consecutive NCAA Division II Football Championships, from 1993 to 1995. He was also the athletic director at West Alabama from 2018 to 2021.

Playing career
Wallace was a multi-sport athlete at Callaway High School in Jackson, Mississippi, lettering three years each in football, basketball, baseball, and track. He also earned prep All-America honors before enrolling at Mississippi State University.  After starting for three seasons as a defensive back at MSU under Bob Tyler, Wallace earned his Bachelor of Science degree in Physical Education in 1976 and stayed the following year to serve the Bulldogs as a graduate assistant coach.

Coaching career

Assistant coaching career
Wallace started his coaching career as a graduate assistant at Mississippi State University in 1976. The following season, he joined Hall of Fame coach Pat Dye's staff at East Carolina to coach defensive backs. He followed Dye to Wyoming and Auburn, before returning to his alma-mater Mississippi State as defensive coordinator. During his tenure at Auburn, Wallace was noted for recruiting standout running back Bo Jackson. In 1987, he coached defensive backs at Illinois.

North Alabama
Bobby Wallace's career as a head coach began in 1988 when he was named head coach at the University of North Alabama (UNA) in Florence, Alabama. He compiled a record of 82–36–1 in 10 seasons (1988–1997) at UNA, leading the Lions to three consecutive Division II national championships in 1993, 1994 and 1995. During those three seasons, the Lions recorded an overall record of 41–1, losing only to the eventual Division I-AA national champion Youngstown State in 1994. The 1995 UNA team was named the "Best Team of the Quarter Century" in Division II.

Wallace's UNA teams also won three consecutive Gulf South Conference championships (1993–1995), qualified for the Division II playoffs six times, and sent 12 players to the National Football League (NFL). In 1995, Lions linebacker Ronald McKinnon became the first and, as of 2016, only defensive player to win the Division II Harlon Hill Trophy. He resigned at UNA following the 1997 season to become the head coach at Temple University.

Temple
Wallace became the 23rd head coach at Temple University on December 7, 1997. He coached the Owls for eight seasons, compiling a record of 19–71. Although his first team at Temple finished 2–9, one of the wins became arguably one of the biggest upsets in college football history. On October 17, 1998, the 0–6 Owls traveled to Blacksburg, Virginia to play the Virginia Tech Hokies. The Owls overcame a 17–0 deficit and numerous injuries to upset the Hokies, 28–24. The win gave the Owls their first ever Big East road win, and their first win over a ranked opponent in 11 years. Two weeks later, the Owls won again in improbable fashion, this time overcoming a 20–0 deficit to defeat Pittsburgh.

Although his teams were consistently good defensively, none of Wallace's eight Temple teams had winning records. The Owls were winless during his final season in 2005, and played as an NCAA Division I-A independent after losing their Big East affiliation. During his tenure at Temple, Wallace had 12 players selected All-Big East. He coached All-Americans Dan Klecko and Rian Wallace.

West Alabama
Wallace was hired to be the head coach at West Alabama in March 2006.  Wallace's first UWA team went 6-5, achieving the program's first winning season since 1992.  In 2009 West Alabama went 8-5 and made the NCAA Division II playoffs for the first time since 1975.  In 2010, he led the Tigers to a 7-4 record posting back-to-back winning seasons for the first time since 1991-92.  Wallace retired from UWA following the 2010 season.

Return to North Alabama
On January 2, 2012, the University of North Alabama announced that Wallace would return as the Lions' ninth head football coach following the departure of Terry Bowden. On September 26, 2015, Wallace coached North Alabama to a school-record tying 109th career win over Florida Tech. On October 3, Wallace became the winningest head coach in program history notching his 110th win with a 34–12 victory over Valdosta State. In 2016 Wallace led the Lions to their fourth straight Gulf South Conference championship.  It was the first time the feat had been accomplished in conference history.  The Lions went on to play for the NCAA Division 2 National Championship where they were defeated by Northwest Missouri State  Wallace retired following the 2016 season finishing his career with a 126–51–1 record at UNA and 171–152–1 overall.

Head coaching record

References

External links
 Temple profile

1954 births
Living people
American football safeties
Auburn Tigers football coaches
East Carolina Pirates football coaches
Illinois Fighting Illini football coaches
Mississippi State Bulldogs football coaches
Mississippi State Bulldogs football players
North Alabama Lions football coaches
Temple Owls football coaches
West Alabama Tigers athletic directors
West Alabama Tigers football coaches
Wyoming Cowboys football coaches
People from Magnolia, Arkansas
Coaches of American football from Mississippi
Players of American football from Jackson, Mississippi